Kinyongia tolleyae is a species of chameleons endemic to Uganda. Its common name is Tolley's forest chameleon.

References

Kinyongia
Lizards of Africa
Reptiles of Uganda
Endemic fauna of Uganda
Reptiles described in 2017
Taxa named by Daniel F. Hughes
Taxa named by Chifundera Kusamba
Taxa named by Eli Greenbaum